Acosmetia is a genus of moths of the family Noctuidae.

Species
 Acosmetia arida de Joannis, 1909
 Acosmetia biguttula (Motschulsky, 1866)
 Acosmetia caliginosa (Hübner, [1813])
 Acosmetia chinensis (Wallengren, 1860)
 Acosmetia confusa (Wileman, 1915)
 Acosmetia malgassica Kenrick, 1917
 Acosmetia tenuipennis Hampson, 1909

References
 
 

Condicinae
Noctuoidea genera